Princeton (formerly, Ket-tee) is a census-designated place in Colusa County, California. It lies at an elevation of 82 feet (25 m). Its ZIP code is 95970 and its area code is 530. Princeton's population was 303 at the 2010 census.

History
Before Euro-American settlers came to the region, Colus Indians inhabited the region. The first Euro-American settler in the area around Princeton was John S. Williams, who was sent by Thomas Larkin, the American Consul to Mexico, whose children were given an 44,364 acre land grant from Governor Manuel Micheltorena in 1844. Williams built an adobe in 1847 near the abandoned Patwin village of Chah’ de’-he near Princeton and established a successful cattle ranch. 

The first establishment in what became the town proper was a roadhouse called the Sixteen-Mile House, built in 1851. In the 1870s grain farming became successful in the region. Princeton had a grain warehouse and served as a point where farmers could bring their grain to be shipped by boat to larger markets down river. By 1897 Princeton was a small town of 250 people with a number of businesses including a bank, hotel, and grocery store.

For nearly 130 years Princeton had an operating ferry that connected residents to the community of Afton across the Sacramento River. However, it was closed down by Glenn County officials in 1986 due to safety and financial considerations. The remains of the ferry and dock can be found at 39°24'43.3"N 122°00'35.1"W

Demographics
The 2010 United States Census reported that Princeton had a population of 303. The racial makeup of Princeton was 217 (71.6%) White, 0 (0.0%) African American, 10 (3.3%) Native American, 1 (0.3%) Asian, 1 (0.3%) Pacific Islander, 70 (23.1%) from other races, and 4 (1.3%) from two or more races. Hispanic or Latino of any race were 93 persons (30.7%).

The Census reported that 303 people (100% of the population) lived in households, 0 (0%) lived in non-institutionalized group quarters, and 0 (0%) were institutionalized.

There were 124 households, out of which 32 (25.8%) had children under the age of 18 living in them, 70 (56.5%) were opposite-sex married couples living together, 11 (8.9%) had a female householder with no husband present, 7 (5.6%) had a male householder with no wife present.  There were 9 (7.3%) unmarried opposite-sex partnerships, and 2 (1.6%) same-sex married couples or partnerships. 25 households (20.2%) were made up of individuals, and 11 (8.9%) had someone living alone who was 65 years of age or older. The average household size was 2.44.  There were 88 families (71.0% of all households); the average family size was 2.78.

The population was spread out, with 60 people (19.8%) under the age of 18, 23 people (7.6%) aged 18 to 24, 59 people (19.5%) aged 25 to 44, 112 people (37.0%) aged 45 to 64, and 49 people (16.2%) who were 65 years of age or older.  The median age was 47.1 years. For every 100 females, there were 103.4 males.  For every 100 females age 18 and over, there were 109.5 males.

The homeowner vacancy rate was 1.2%; the rental vacancy rate was 4.7%.  196 people (64.7% of the population) lived in owner-occupied housing units and 107 people (35.3%) lived in rental housing units.

Politics

Education
Princeton has a high school and elementary school, both of which have an enrollment of little over 100 students each.

References

External links
 Colusa County page

Census-designated places in Colusa County, California
Census-designated places in California